Shiswa Kataiya  is a village in Manara Shiswa Municipality  in Mahottari District in the Janakpur Zone of south-eastern Nepal. At the time of the 1991 Nepal census it had a population of 5881 people living in 1004 individual households.

References

External links
UN map of the municipalities of Mahottari District

Populated places in Mahottari District